Dolor Davis was born about 1599 in Kent, England. He married Margery Willard daughter of Richard Willard of Horsemonden, yeomen in Parish church, East Farleigh, Kent, England March 29, 1624. Margery was baptized at Horsemonden, November 7, 1602 and died before 
1667. Margery's brother Simon would become a lifelong friend of Dolor Davis. Other than being a carpenter and Master Builder nothing is known of him until he sailed to America and landed in Boston in May 1634. He quickly bought  of land on the west side of the river in Cambridge, Massachusettson August 4, 1635.[about where Harvard College is today]
On April 17, 1635, his wife and three children embarked from London for New England, arrived on the Elizabeth, and they decided to live in Cambridge. On June 4, 1635, Davis bought a lot of half a rood for a home, which was located on what is now the corner of Winthrop and Dunster streets.
However, Davis and his friend Willard decided not to stay in Cambridge, like many of the settlers during the years of 1635-1636. In August 1635, Davis and Willard sold their land in Cambridge to Richard Girling. and became a member of the Duxbury Church in 1640 as well.

Duxbury
Dolor Davis moved to Duxbury, August 5, 1638–39, was admitted freemen, and was granted land there in 1640. During the year of 1640, Davis was granted  and land for his cows to graze. He became a member of the Duxbury Church in 1640 as well. Dolor and his wife were dismissed from the Duxbury church to the Barnstable church, August 27, 1648. He only stayed here  for 3  years  before he moved to  Barnstable

Barnstable
In 1643, Davis moved again, this time to Barnstable. He and his sons appeared on a list of men in Barnstable between "16 to 60 years of age to bear arms". In June 1645, he was sworn in as a member of the Grand Inquest of Plymouth Colony. He also tried to become a freeman, and a year later he became a freeman of Barnstable. In 1652, Dolor Davis was chosen as a surveyor of highways in Barnstable. In 1654, he was then chosen to become the constable of Barnstable. He continued to live in Barnstable and practice his trade as a carpenter until he left for Concord in 1655.
In 1666 Dollar returned to Barnstable From Concord and remained in Barnstable till he died during June 1673. Dolor's will, dated September 13th 1672, was proved July 2, 1673. Dolor mentions his sons Simon and Samuel as already having their portions; his son John and son in law Lewis, with Mary, Lewis's wife;daughter Ruth Hall.

Concord
In 1656 Dolor left Plymouth Colony and returned to Concord, Massachusetts, his home for the next 11 years. He bought  of land, with a house in an assortment of different parcels, from Roger Draper of Concord. This property soon became Davis's homestead in Concord. He also met up with his friend Simon Willard while he lived in Concord. In 1659, he was recorded as one of the landowners in Concord. Sometime during his stay in Concord, his wife Margery died. Alone, he left Concord in 1666 back to Barnstable.

Pronunciation of his first name
Dolor Davis's name is pronounced dollar. Throughout his life, the variations of his name are spelt Dolor, Dolar, Dolard, Dolord, Dolore, Dollard, Dolerd, Dollerd, Dollar and Dollar.

Marriage and children
Dolar Davis married Margery Willard of Horsemonden, Kent, in 1624. Margery Willard was born sometime around 1602, as that is when she was christened. They had six children, three who were born in England and the other three born in America. They were:

John, born 1626,in East Farleigh, England, inherited homestead; Died April 9, 1703 in Banestable, MA.; married Hannah Linnell
Mary, born 1631, England
Elizabeth, born 1633, England, died young
Samuel, born July 11, 1639, Cambridge, Massachusetts; Died October 30, 1720 in Concord, Middlesex Co. MA.; married Mary Meadows
Simon, born 1640, Massachusetts
Ruth, born 1645, Barnstable, Massachusetts

References

16th-century births
1672 deaths
17th-century English people
People from Kent